Statistics of Belgian First Division in the 1981–82 season.

Overview

It was contested by 18 teams, and Standard Liège won the championship.

League standings

Results

References

Belgian Pro League seasons
Belgian
1981–82 in Belgian football